Zhu Fuxi (born July 2, 1955) is a general (shang jiang) of the Chinese People's Liberation Army (PLA). He served as the inaugural Political Commissar of the Western Theater Command, and the last Commissar of the Chengdu Military Region.

Biography
Zhu was born in Linhai, Zhejiang province. In 2002 he was named head of the Political Department of the 12th Group Army. In 2003 he was named deputy secretary-general of the People's Liberation Army General Political Department (GPD). In December 2005, he was promoted to secretary-general. In February 2008, he was named head of the cadres department of the GPD. In December 2009, he became head of the Political Department of the People's Liberation Army Air Force. In July 2011, he was promoted to the rank of lieutenant general. In November 2012, he was promoted to Political Commissar of the Chengdu Military Region. In February 2016, after the military regions were re-organized, Zhu was appointed to the post of Political Commissar of the Western Theater Command, one of only two lieutenant generals to be appointed to a commander or commissar position of a Theater Command. In July 2016, he was promoted to the rank of general.

In January 2017, Zhu was removed from his post as Political Commissar of the Western Theater Command, and was replaced by Lt. Gen. Wu Shezhou. It was an unusual move because at the age of 61, Zhu had not reached the retirement age of 65 for an officer of his rank.

Zhu was a member of the 18th Central Committee of the Communist Party of China.

References

1955 births
Living people
People's Liberation Army generals from Zhejiang
People from Taizhou, Zhejiang
Political commissars of the Chengdu Military Region
Political commissars of Western Theater Command